Gran Tierra Energy is an energy company founded by Jeffrey Scott, Dana Coffield, Max Wei, Jim Hart and Rafael Orunesu in May 2005. The company, based in Calgary, Alberta, Canada, focuses on oil and gas exploration, development and production, particularly in South America. The company announced its intentions to merge with Solana Resources on 29 July 2008.

History
In 2011, the company acquired Petrolifera Petroleum, a Canadian oil and gas company engaged in exploration and production activity in South America.

References

External links
 Official website

Energy companies of Canada
Companies based in Calgary
Energy companies established in 2003
Non-renewable resource companies established in 2003
2003 establishments in Canada
Companies listed on NYSE American
Companies listed on the Toronto Stock Exchange